God's Country Radio Network was a Religious broadcasting radio network in the United States which launched in 2008.  The majority of stations that the network aired on were owned by the non-profit organization Educational Media Foundation, though it also aired on some independent stations.  God's Country Radio Network played a blend of Southern Gospel and Positive Country music.

In November 2010, God's Country Radio Network left the air because it "didn't connect with enough listeners to sustain the expenses of the broadcast". It relaunched in January 2011 as a web-based only broadcaster, which has since shut down also.

There is an unrelated "God's Country" network of stations in Maine, WMDR-FM and WWLN, owned by Light of Light Ministries.

Affiliates at Time of Closure
 KGCD: Lincoln, North Dakota
 KGCE: Post, Texas
 KGCL: Jordan Valley, Oregon
 KGCM: Belgrade, Montana
 KGCN: Roswell, New Mexico
 KGCO: Fort Collins, Colorado
 KQGC: Belen, New Mexico
 WGCN: Nashville, Georgia
 WGCQ: Hayti, Missouri
 WNBV: Grundy, Virginia
 WOKR: Remsen, New York
 WPRN-FM: Lisman, Alabama

References

External links

Christian radio stations in the United States
Radio stations established in 2008
Radio stations disestablished in 2010

Defunct radio networks in the United States
Defunct radio stations in the United States